Jonna Opitz (born 22 July 1969) is a Swedish former professional tennis player. She played under the name Jonna Jonerup.

Biography
Jonerup reached a best singles ranking of 147 in the world competing on the professional tour. In 1988 she was a quarter-finalist at the Taipei Women's Championships and had a win over Jana Novotná at the European Indoors in Zurich.

Between 1988 and 1991, Jonerup featured in four Federation Cup ties for Sweden. She was unbeaten in her three doubles rubbers, with her only loss coming in her sole singles appearance.

She is now known as Jonna Opitz and is an executive for manufacturing company Inwido in Malmö.

ITF finals

Singles (3–1)

Doubles (2–4)

See also
 List of Sweden Fed Cup team representatives

References

External links
 
 
 

1969 births
Living people
Swedish female tennis players
20th-century Swedish women
21st-century Swedish women